Kocatepe, historically Tilfar ( 'mouse's tell'), is a village in the Nizip District, Gaziantep Province, Turkey.

References

Villages in Nizip District